Cockscomb Buttress is a prominent, isolated rock buttress rising to , standing  northwest of Echo Mountain and overlooking the east side of Norway Bight on the south coast of Coronation Island, in the South Orkney Islands. The name, which is descriptive, was given by the Falkland Islands Dependencies Survey  following their survey of 1950.

References 

Coronation Island
Mountains of the South Orkney Islands